Danyang may refer to:

Locations in China
Danyang, Jiangsu (丹阳市), county-level city of Jiangsu
Danyang railway station
Danyang East railway station
Danyang North railway station
Danyang, Ma'anshan (丹阳镇), town in Bowang District, Ma'anshan, Anhui
Danyang, Lianjiang (丹阳镇), town in Lianjiang County, Fujian
Danyang, Changde (丹阳街道), subdistrict in Wuling District, Changde, Hunan
Danyang (Chu) (丹陽), ancient capital of the State of Chu

Korea
Danyang County (단양군 / 丹陽郡), Chungcheongbuk-do, South Korea

See also
Danyang Road station, Shanghai Metro
Yang Dan (disambiguation)